Malacca Al-Quran Museum is a museum about Quran in Malacca City, Malacca, Malaysia, which was developed with the cooperation between Restu Foundation and Malacca State Government and opened to the public on 10 January 2008. It is located next to the state mosque of Malacca and consists of 12 main halls and a shop.

The museum exhibits various collections of the Quran, ranging from old manuscripts, special collections to arts, as well as the history of the spread of Islam from the divine revelation during Prophet Muhammad time and his close friends throughout the Middle East, Indochina and the rest of the Malay world.

See also
 List of museums in Malaysia
 List of tourist attractions in Malacca

References

2008 establishments in Malaysia
Museums established in 2008
Museums in Malacca
Quranic places
Islamic museums in Malaysia